Topi Anjala (born 5 July 1984) is a Finnish orienteering competitor. He represented Finland at the 2009 World Orienteering Championships in Miskolc, where he placed 15th in the long distance, and won a bronze medal in the relay, together with Tero Föhr and Mats Haldin. His career best personal best is seventh place in the long distance at the 2008 World Championships in the Czech Republic. Anjala has won the Jukola relay in 2016 and 2018.

Anjala's parents Ari Anjala and Outi Borgenström are also orienteers.

References

External links
 
 Topi Anjala at World of O Runners

1984 births
Living people
Finnish orienteers
Male orienteers
Foot orienteers
World Orienteering Championships medalists